The Louisiana Ragin' Cajuns football program is a college football team that represents the University of Louisiana at Lafayette at the NCAA Division I Football Bowl Subdivision (FBS) level as a member of the Sun Belt Conference. Since 1971, the team has played its home games at Cajun Field in Lafayette, Louisiana. Michael Desormeaux has served as Louisiana's head coach since 2021.

The RCAF (Ragin Cajun Athletic Foundation) is the supporter association that assists with funding for all Ragin Cajun sports.

The program began play in 1901 when the school was known as Southwestern Louisiana Industrial Institute. The school's sports teams were known as the Southwestern Louisiana Bulldogs from 1921 until 1973. The school's fight name was formally changed to Ragin' Cajuns in 1974, which had been in use since the 1960s. In 1999, the university took on its current name, at which point its sports teams were referred to as Louisiana–Lafayette. A rebranding in 2017 dropped "Lafayette" from the Cajuns' name.

Between 2011 and 2014, the Cajuns won four consecutive New Orleans Bowls, representing the most successful stretch in the program's history at the time, but later had to vacate two of the victories due to NCAA violations.

Between 2018 and 2021, during the tenure of head coach Billy Napier, the Cajuns reached many milestones, including the first National ranking in program history, four consecutive division championships, two conference championships, three bowl championships, and the best season finish and conference finish in the 2021 season, finishing 13-1 and 7-0 in conference play.

The Cajuns have had several players go to play professionally in the National Football League (NFL), including Jake Delhomme, Charles Tillman, Brian Mitchell, Orlando Thomas, Brandon Stokely, Elijah McGuire, Elijah Mitchell, Kevin Dotson, and Levi Lewis.

History

Before 1974, the team's official nickname was the Bulldogs, although the current nickname was in common use with the football team for approximately the decade prior.

Division history

Conference affiliations
Louisiana has been both independent and a member of four different conferences.

 Independent (1901–1947) 

 Gulf States Conference (1948–1970)
 Southland Conference (1971–1981)
 NCAA Division I-A independent (1982–1992)
 Big West Conference (1993–1995)
 Independent (1996–2000)
 Sun Belt Conference (2001–present)

Championships

Conference championships
Louisiana has won 10 conference championships, with the 2013 championship later vacated.

† Co-champions
‡ Louisiana vacated the 2013 Sun Belt Conference co-championship due to major NCAA violations
^ The 2020 championship game was not played due to Coastal Carolina impacted by COVID-19 pandemic For College Football Playoff purposes, Coastal Carolina was viewed as the 2020 Sun Belt Champions.  Recognizing that the College Football Playoff committee had no jurisdiction to that magnitude coupled with a desire to prevent the diminishment to the Louisiana Ragin’ Cajuns football team’s accomplishments in 2020, Lafayette Mayor-President Josh Guillory declared, by executive proclamation, the Louisiana Ragin’ Cajuns football team as the 2020 sole champions of the Sun Belt Conference in football.

Division championships
Louisiana has won four division championships with the most recent in the 2021 season.

^ The 2020 championship game was not played due to Coastal Carolina impacted by COVID-19 pandemic

Postseason history

National Junior College Athletic Association

NCAA Small College Division

NCAA Division I FBS
Since joining the NCAA Division I-A (FBS) in 1978, the Ragin' Cajuns have played in nine bowl games, although two of those games (which were victories) were vacated due to sanctions. Officially, they have a record of 5–3 in bowl games.

† Vacated

Home stadiums

McNaspy Stadium

In 1940 McNaspy Stadium was built on the campus of Southwestern Louisiana Institute (now University of Louisiana at Lafayette). It served as the Cajuns home field through the 1970 season and was demolished in 2000. McNaspy Stadium was located at the site where the current computer science building Oliver Hall now stands.

Cajun Field

Cajun Field is a football stadium located in the city of Lafayette, Louisiana, and has served as the home field of the Louisiana Ragin' Cajuns football team since 1970. 
Cajun Field has an official capacity of 41,426 with 2,577 chairback seats, and its nickname is "The Swamp."

In June of 2021 it was announced that Cajun Field would be undergoing a $75 million renovation, with construction slated to begin summer of 2022.  The plans are to demolish the current West Tower, and replace it with a state of the art facility, including amenities such as premium suites, a club level and club seats, loge boxes, and press box. Because of a $15 million donation, the stadium will now be known as “Cajun Field at Our Lady of Lourdes Stadium.”

Head coaches

† Hudspeth's record of 51–38 was reduced to 29–38 due to alleged NCAA violations.

Rivalries

Lamar

Although no longer an active rivalry, the first Sabine Shoe trophy was first awarded in 1937 to the winner of the SLI–Lamar football game. The name of the bronze rivalry trophy was derived from the Sabine River that forms the Texas-Louisiana border. USL defeated Lamar in the 1978 edition of the rivalry game, but the Ragin' Cajuns were not awarded the trophy as it had vanished. The Sabine Shoe trophy now sits in at trophy case in the Ragin' Cajun Athletic Complex.

McNeese State

Another former rivalry.  When active the Cajun Crown was the name of the trophy between Louisiana and McNeese State.

Southeastern Louisiana

This is another former rivalry.  The Cypress Mug was the turned, polished mahogany mug awarded to the winner of the Southwestern–Southeastern football game.

Louisiana–Monroe

The Battle on the Bayou is the annual rivalry game between Louisiana Ragin' Cajuns and Louisiana–Monroe. The wooden boot-shaped rivalry trophy was created in 2002 to be awarded to the victors.

Appalachian State

Arkansas State

Louisiana Tech

Notable players

Michael Adams
Louis Age
Patrise Alexander
James Atkins
D'Anthony Batiste
Bill Blackburn
C. C. Brown
Wayde Butler
Chris Cagle
Raymond Calais
Anthony Clement
Kenyon Cotton
Richie Cunningham
Jake Delhomme
Michael Desormeaux
Kevin Dotson
Tyrell Fenroy
Jason Fletcher
Ladarius Green
Justin Hamilton
Alonzo Harris
Mark Hall
Kyries Hebert
Keno Hills
Weldon Humble
Robert Hunt
Elvis Joseph
Damon Mason
Randy McClanahan
Elijah McGuire
Brian Mitchell
Elijah Mitchell
Donovan Morgan
Christian Ringo
Todd Scott
Rafael Septién
Antwain Spann
Fred Stamps
Brandon Stokley
Ike Taylor
Orlando Thomas
Charles Tillman
Clarence Verdin
Tracy Walker
Melvin White

Future non-conference opponents 
Announced schedules as of February 2, 2023.

See also
List of NCAA Division I FBS football programs

References

External links

 

 
American football teams established in 1902
1902 establishments in Louisiana